David Joanasie (born June 22, 1983) is a Canadian Inuk politician from Cape Dorset, Nunavut. He was elected to the Legislative Assembly of Nunavut in the 2013 election. He represents the electoral district of South Baffin.

Education 
David attended school at Cape Dorset and learned Inuktitut up until third grade. He graduated from Peter Pitseolak High School in 2001, and was interested in mathematics. He eventually earned a certificate in business communication from Saint Mary’s University in Halifax and a diploma from Algonquin College.

Career

Pre-legislative assembly 
Prior to his election, he was Communications Manager of the Qikiqtani Inuit Association and he worked for the Inuit Tapiriit Kanatami.

Elections 
He was elected twice to serve in the 5th Legislative Assembly of Nunavut. He was re-elected to represent the constituency of South Baffin. He was also elected to serve in the Executive Council on November 17, 2017. He was sworn into office on November 21, 2017. He currently serves as the Minister of Education, Minister of Culture and Heritage, and Minister of Languages.

Impaired driving incident 
In July 2013, David was arrested for drunk driving in Prince Edward Island. He attempted to evade police by fleeing to Charlottetown. He pleaded guilty, and was sent to jail. He was ordered to pay a $1200 dollar fine along with $500 in victim sub-charges.

Personal life 
David is married to Emily Joanasie, and together they have five children: Sayri, Cynthia, Qulittalik, Pittaaluk, and Pattu.

References

Living people
Members of the Legislative Assembly of Nunavut
Inuit from the Northwest Territories
Inuit politicians
21st-century Canadian politicians
1983 births
Inuit from Nunavut
Members of the Executive Council of Nunavut
People from Kinngait